Kate Raworth (born 13 December 1970) is an English economist known for "doughnut economics", an economic model that balances between essential human needs and planetary boundaries. She is Senior Associate at Oxford University’s Environmental Change Institute and a Professor of Practice at Amsterdam University of Applied Sciences.

Education 
Raworth achieved first class honours in Politics, Philosophy and Economics at the University of Oxford and followed it with an MSc in Development Economics. She holds an honorary doctorate from Business School Lausanne.

Career 
From 1994 to 1997 Raworth worked promoting micro-enterprise development in Zanzibar as a Fellow of the Overseas Development Institute. From 1997 to 2001 she was economist and co-author of the United Nations Development Programme's Human Development Report, writing chapters on globalization, new technologies, resource consumption and human rights. From 2002 to 2013 she was a Senior Researcher at Oxfam. She is currently a Senior Research Associate, Tutor and Advisory Board member of the Environmental Change Institute of the University of Oxford. She is also a Senior Associate at the Cambridge Institute for Sustainability Leadership, and a member of the advisory board at the ZOE Institute for Future-fit Economies.

In 2017, Raworth published Doughnut Economics: Seven Ways to Think Like a 21st-Century Economist  which elaborates on her concept of Doughnut Economics, first developed in her 2012 paper, A Safe and Just Space for Humanity. Her 2017 book is a robust counter-proposal to mainstream economic thinking, and she advocates for conditions to create a sustainable economy. Raworth argues for a radical re-consideration of the foundations of Economic Science, and is particularly critical of the outdated principle of unfettered growth, in that it is destructive of planetary resources while ill-serving human needs including Quality of Life. Instead of focusing on the growth of the economy, she focuses on a model where there can be ensured that everyone on Earth has access to their basic needs, such as adequate food and education, while not limiting opportunities for future generations by protecting our Ecosystem. The book was longlisted for the 2017 Financial Times and McKinsey Business Book of the Year Award.

In 2020, Raworth was inaugurated as Professor of Practice at Amsterdam University of Applied Sciences. In this  role, she serves as a strategic advisor to the Doughnut Hub: a place where students, lecturers and researchers, in collaboration with stakeholders in the Amsterdam area, develop knowledge based on the principles of her work. 

In 2021, Raworth was appointed to the World Health Organization's Council on the Economics of Health For All, chaired by Mariana Mazzucato.

See also 
 Doughnut (economic model)
 Ecological economics
 Humanistic economics
 Tim Jackson

References

Further reading

External links 
 
 TED 2018. Kate Raworth: A healthy economy should be designed to thrive not grow. (video)
 Doughnut Economics Action Lab (DEAL)

1970 births
21st-century British economists
British women economists
British development economists
Ecological economists
Sustainability advocates
Living people